Thomas Bernard (c. 1769 – 18 May 1834) was an Irish politician.

He was the son of Thomas Bernard of Castle Bernard, Birr, King's County (now County Offaly), and his first wife, Mary, daughter of Jonathan Willington, of Castle Willington. He commissioned the building of a new gothic mansion on the family estate named Kinnitty Castle.

He was appointed High Sheriff of King's County for 1798–1799. He was then elected at the 1802 general election as a Member of Parliament (MP) for King's County (now County Offaly), holding the seat until 1833.

He died intestate in Dublin in 1834. He had married twice: firstly the Hon. Elizabeth Prittie, daughter of Henry Prittie, 1st Baron Dunalley, and secondly Catherine Henrietta, the daughter of Francis Hely-Hutchinson, MP, with whom he had four sons and two daughters. His estate passed to his eldest son Thomas, an army officer.

References

External links 
 

    
    
    

1769 births
1834 deaths
High Sheriffs of King's County
Members of the Parliament of the United Kingdom for King's County constituencies (1801–1922)
UK MPs 1802–1806
UK MPs 1806–1807
UK MPs 1807–1812
UK MPs 1812–1818
UK MPs 1818–1820
UK MPs 1820–1826
UK MPs 1826–1830
UK MPs 1830–1831
UK MPs 1831–1832
UK MPs 1832–1835